Zelma Wilson (November 23, 1918 – May 10, 1996) was an American architect, practicing mainly in California.

Early life and education
Zelma Gussin was born in New York City, the daughter of Russian Jewish immigrants. She and her older sister were raised in Santa Paula, California, by their mother Rose (a shopkeeper) and their stepfather, Ed Kraus. She graduated from Santa Paula Union High School, where she played on the tennis team. She majored in art at the University of California Berkeley and later studied at the California Institute of Technology. At the USC School of Architecture, she was the only woman in her 1947 graduating class.

Career
In 1948 she worked as a draftsperson at the Los Angeles City Planning Department. She moved to France with her family after her husband was blacklisted in 1952. In Paris, Zelma pursued her interest in sculpture at the École des Beaux-Arts. She earned her architecture license in 1957, and worked with Richard Neutra, Victor Gruen, Rudolph Schindler, and Raphael Soriano. The Wilsons settled in Ojai upon returning to California in 1964.

Zelma Wilson opened her architectural practice in Ojai, Zelma Wilson and Associates, AIA, in 1967. Wilson primarily designed community buildings such as schools, churches, and libraries (see list of works below), but she also designed private residences, banks, and at least one bridge. She served as president of the Ventura County branch of the AIA in 1977. In 1983 she was named a Fellow of the American Institute of Architects.

In addition to her architectural firm, Wilson lectured on architecture at Cal Poly San Luis Obispo. She also served on the California State Governors Emergency Task Force on Earthquake Preparedness, and was active in Ojai organizations, including the "Ojai Beautiful" conference, Ojai Downtown Redevelopment, the Ojai Historical Preservation Commission, and the Ojai Valley Performing Arts Theater. In 1994, she received the City of Ojai's "Lifetime Achievement in the Arts Award." In 1978 she traveled to China with a group of California architects and engineers at the invitation of the Architectural Society of China, to work on structural issues in earthquake-prone regions.

Partial list of works
The following buildings or structures were among those designed by Zelma Wilson:
Ojai Branch Bank of America Bank of America; Ojai, CA (1956)
Peck residence; Ventura, CA (1973-1974)
Simi Valley Public Library; Simi, Valley CA (1979)
Ojai City Hall; Ojai, CA (1976)
Meditation Mount educational center; Ojai, CA (1971)
Iwata Garden Center; Ojai, CA (1967)
Oak Grove Elementary School; Ojai, CA
Villanova Preparatory School Gymnasium; Ojai, CA
Ojai Valley Athletic Club; Ojai, CA
The Thatcher School/Thatcher School; Ojai, CA (1987-1989)
Stroberg/Patterson residence; Ojai, CA (1989-1991)

Personal life

Zelma Gussin married screenwriter Michael Wilson in 1941; the couple had two daughters together. Her older sister Sylvia was married to Paul Jarrico, another blacklisted screenwriter. Zelma and Michael Wilson were members of the American Communist Party from 1938 until early 1956.

Zelma Wilson was widowed in 1978. As Michael Wilson's widow, she was presented with his posthumous Academy Award in 1985. She died in 1996, days before she was scheduled to be an honored guest of the Ojai Film Society.

Legacy
Zelma Wilson's professional papers are held at Virginia Polytechnic Institute and State University in Blacksburg. She appears in the 1987 television documentary "Legacy of the Hollywood Blacklist," discussing her family's experience of the blacklist.

There is a plaque in Libbey Park in Ojai, dedicating a nearby tree to "Zelma Gussin Wilson, FAIA, 1918–1996, Pioneering Architect, City Planner, Conservationist, Teacher, Mentor, & Artist. Passionate Protector of Ojai's Beauty."

References

1918 births
1996 deaths
20th-century American architects
American women architects
Architects from New York City
People from Santa Paula, California
Architects from California
UC Berkeley College of Letters and Science alumni
California Institute of Technology alumni
USC School of Architecture alumni
American people of Russian-Jewish descent
20th-century American women artists